State Route 61 (SR 61) is a north–south state highway in the northern portion of the U.S. state of Ohio. Its southern terminus is at the U.S. Route 36/State Route 3 concurrency in Sunbury, and its northern terminus is at U.S. Route 6 east of Huron, at the southernmost point of Lake Erie (which is subsequently the southernmost northern border of the United States).  State Route 61 is routed through the communities of Mount Gilead, Galion, Crestline, Shelby, Plymouth, Norwalk, and Berlin Heights.

Major junctions

SR 61C
State Route 61C (SR 61C) is a  connection between the Norwalk Bypass US 20/SR 18 and SR 61 southwest of Norwalk.  The intersection forms a sideways triangle with SR 61 as the base on the east, US 20 as the south side, and Route 61C as the north side. SR 61C exists because US 20 bridges SR 61 on the south side of the triangle and would have not intersected SR 61 otherwise.  SR 61C is part of a former alignment of US 20.

References

061
Transportation in Delaware County, Ohio
Transportation in Morrow County, Ohio
Transportation in Crawford County, Ohio
Transportation in Richland County, Ohio
Transportation in Huron County, Ohio
Transportation in Erie County, Ohio